Doriopsilla is a genus of sea slugs, dorid nudibranchs, shell-less marine gastropod molluscs in the family Dendrodorididae.

Description
Doriopsilla and Dendrodoris are genera which have frequently been confused, partly because both lack a radula. They feed by dissolving their sponge food externally, using enzymes, and then ingesting sponge cells without the sponge skeleton. They share this loss of the radula and method of feeding with the Phyllidiidae but look more like other Dorid nudibranchs in having a rosette of gills surrounding a dorsal anus, whilst Phyllidiidae have the gills located beneath the edge of the mantle.

Species
Species so far described in this genus include:
 
 Doriopsilla albopunctata (J.G. Cooper, 1863)
 Doriopsilla areolata (Bergh, 1880)
 Doriopsilla aurea (Quoy & Gaimard, 1832)
 Doriopsilla bertschi Hoover, Lindsay, Goddard & Valdés, 2015
 Doriopsilla capensis Bergh, 1907
 Doriopsilla carneola (Angas, 1864)
 Doriopsilla davebehrensi Hoover, Lindsay, Goddard & Valdés, 2015
 Doriopsilla debruini Perrone, 2001
 Doriopsilla elitae Valdés & Hamann, 2008
 Doriopsilla espinosai Valdés & Ortea, 1998
 Doriopsilla fulva (MacFarland, 1905)
 Doriopsilla gemela Gosliner, Schaefer & Millen, 1999
 Doriopsilla janaina Marcus and Marcus, 1967 
 Doriopsilla miniata (Alder and Hancock, 1864)
 Doriopsilla nigrocera Yonow, 2012 
 Doriopsilla nigrolineata Meyer, 1977
 Doriopsilla pallida Bergh, 1902
 Doriopsilla peculiaris (Abraham, 1877)
 Doriopsilla pelseneeri Oliviera, 1895
 Doriopsilla pharpa Er. Marcus, 1961
 Doriopsilla rowena Er. Marcus & Ev. Marcus, 1967  
 Doriopsilla spaldingi Valdes & Behrens, 1998
 Doriopsilla tishae Valdés & Hamann, 2008

Species brought into synonymy
 Doriopsilla ciminoi Avila, Ballesteros & Ortea, 1992 accepted as Doriopsilla areolata Bergh, 1880
 Doriopsilla fedalae Pruvot-Fol. 1953 : synonym of Doriopsilla areolata Bergh, 1880
 Doriopsilla leia Er. Marcus, 1961: synonym of Doriopsilla pharpa Er. Marcus, 1961
 Doriopsilla nigromaculata (Cockerell in Coc and Eliot, 1905): synonym of Dendrodoris nigromaculata (Cockerell, 1905)
 Doriopsilla pusilla Pruvot-Fol, 1951 accepted as Doriopsilla areolata Bergh, 1880
 Doriopsilla rarispinosa Pruvot-Fol, 1951 accepted as Doriopsilla areolata Bergh, 1880

References

Dendrodorididae